Abdul Latiff bin Ahmad (Jawi: عبداللطيف بن أحمد ; born 9 July 1958) is a Malaysian politician who served as Minister in the Prime Minister's Department for Special Functions from 2021 to 2022. He was the Member of Parliament (MP) for Mersing from 1999 to 2022.

Abdul Latiff previously served as Minister of Rural Development from 2020 to 2021. He held various posts such as Deputy Minister of Defence, Deputy Minister of Health, and Deputy Minister of Human Resources.

Abdul Latiff was a member of the United Malays National Organisation (UMNO), a component party of the Barisan Nasional (BN) coalition. He left UMNO in 2018, and joined the Malaysian United Indigenous Party (BERSATU) the following year. BERSATU is a component party of the Perikatan Nasional (PN) coalition.

Political career
Abd Latiff was firstly elected to the Johor State Legislative Assembly for Endau seat in 1995 election. In the 1999 general election he switched to federal politics by contesting and winning to be the MP of Mersing constituency in Johor, and thereafter served as Deputy Minister of Human Resources (1999 to 2004), Deputy Minister of Health (2004 to 2008) and Deputy Minister of Defence (2008 to 2013). He was reelected MP for the Mersing parliamentary seat in the consecutive 2004, 2008, 2013 and 2018 general elections.

Abd Latiff was dropped from Najib Razak's cabinet after the 2013 general election, and was appointed as the chairman of the government-linked housing development company Syarikat Perumahan Negara Berhad (SPNB). He left SPNB in early 2019 after BN lost as the ruling federal government to Pakatan Harapan (PH) in the 2018 election.

Controversies and issues

Insulting UMNO
On 8 July 2020, he said UMNO was an unscrupulous party in Sabah after its leaders jumped to Parti Pribumi Bersatu Malaysia (Bersatu). Earlier, a video featuring Abdul Latif's statement in an open forum on the matter was spread on social media where he mentioned "Sabahans do not mention jumping but call migration and usually from Berjaya to PBS, PBS goes to UMNO. Meanwhile, Abdul Latiff's statement met with opposition from UMNO leaders who are now urging him to resign. After receiving word of mouth from UMNO leaders, finally he admitted his mistake. While reminding UMNO, the real enemy is the opponents and they should not quarrel with each other, he said he apologized if the statement regarding "UMNO does not work in Sabah" was misunderstood and hurt the hearts of many parties.

Election results

Honours

Honours of Malaysia
  :
  Companion Class I of the Order of Malacca (DMSM) – Datuk (2003)
  :
  Second Class of the Sultan Ibrahim Medal (PIS II) (1995)
  Companion of the Order of the Crown of Johor (SMJ) (1997)

References

1958 births
Living people
People from Johor
Malaysian people of Malay descent
Malaysian Muslims
Malaysian United Indigenous Party politicians
Former United Malays National Organisation politicians
Independent politicians in Malaysia
Members of the Dewan Rakyat
University of Malaya alumni
21st-century Malaysian politicians
Companions of the Order of the Crown of Johor